Laud is an unincorporated community in Washington Township, Whitley County, in the U.S. state of Indiana.

History
A post office was established at Laud in 1855, and remained in operation until it was discontinued in 1903.

Geography

References

Unincorporated communities in Whitley County, Indiana
Unincorporated communities in Indiana